Víctor Hugo Moreira Teixeira (born 5 October 1982) is an Andorran international footballer who plays for FC Andorra, as a midfielder.

Career
Moreira has played club football for FC Rànger's, UE Sant Julià and FC Lusitanos.

He made his international debut for Andorra in 2008.

References

External links
Víctor Moreira at La Preferente

1982 births
Living people
Andorran footballers
Andorra international footballers
FC Rànger's players
UE Sant Julià players
FC Lusitanos players
F.C. Marco players
FC Andorra players
UE Santa Coloma players
UE Engordany players
Association football midfielders